+1 Music was founded in 2004 as a management and public relations company.  The company now offers direct-to-fan online and social network marketing.

In 2008 the company launched +1 Records.

Members
Ambulance LTD, Atlas Genius, Basement Jaxx, The Boy Least Likely To, The BPA, Caveman, The Cribs, Editors, Frankie & The Heartstrings, The Heavy, Illinois, Jamie T, Kate Nash, The Kooks, Lissie, the morning benders, The Postelles, stellastarr*, TV On The Radio, Two Gallants, White Lies

Diesel-U-Music, JELLY, Lebowski Fest, Playboy Rock the Rabbit, Future Sounds, The US Air Guitar Championships

Notes

External links
 Official site of +1 Music
 Official Twitter of +1 Music
 Official Facebook page of +1 Music

Entertainment companies of the United States